François-Wolff Ligondé (January 17, 1928 in Les Cayes – April 8, 2013) was the Catholic archbishop of the Archdiocese of Port-au-Prince, Haiti.

Ordained to the priesthood in 1954, he was named archbishop in 1966 and retired in 2008.

Ligondé was a close ally of President Jean-Claude Duvalier and the uncle of his wife Michèle Bennett. He presided over their "opulent cathedral wedding" in 1980 which was broadcast live to the nation.

In January 1991, Ligondé reportedly "fled into the night clad only in undershorts" when mobs attacked the Port-au-Prince Cathedral during a coup attempt against President Jean-Bertrand Aristide. He had previously been a critic of Aristide, comparing the government to a Bolshevik dictatorship. This statement was "seen as giving the green light for the coup". Ligondé and other church leaders subsequently went into hiding.

Ligondé died on 8 April 2013.

References

1928 births
2013 deaths
People from Les Cayes
20th-century Roman Catholic archbishops in Haiti
21st-century Roman Catholic archbishops in Haiti
Haitian Roman Catholic archbishops
Roman Catholic archbishops of Port-au-Prince